Petru Popescu (born February 1, 1944 in Bucharest, Romania) is a Romanian-American writer, director and film producer, author of best-selling novels Almost Adam and Amazon Beaming.

Romanian beginnings
His debut was a collection of poems, Zeu printre blocuri ("A God Between Apartment Buildings"). In 1969, he published Prins ("Caught").

He went on a Herder scholarship to Vienna (1971–1972), and in 1973 participated in the  International Writing Program at the University of Iowa.

Emigration
After participating in that writing program, Popescu defected in 1973 or 1974 while in England on a private trip related to the English translation of his book Sfârșitul bahic, taught comparative literature in Great Britain, and moved to the United States in 1975, where he studied at the Center for Advanced Film Studies of the American Film Institute. The Romanian government tried him for treason.  In Romania his books were banned.

At the time of his defection he was the Union of Communist Youth secretary of the Romanian Writers' Union and a candidate member of the Central Committee of the Union of Communist Youth.

In the United States, he married Iris Friedman, with whom he has two children: Adam and Chloe. His 2001 novel The Oasis is noted as "A memoir of love and survival in concentration camp" written in the first person as if in the words of the biographee, Blanka Friedman.

Sundance
Popescu received a letter from Robert Redford inviting him to submit a script for consideration for the Sundance Film Festival.  In 1983, Popescu took Death of an Angel to Sundance, where the script came to near finalization.  The festival enabled him to find backers for the film, which was released in 1986.

Works

Novels written in Romanian
 1969 - Prins
 1970 - Dulce ca mierea e glonțul patriei
 1973 - Să crești într-un an cât alții într-o zi
 1973 - Sfârșitul bahic
 1974 - Copiii Domnului
 1993 - Înainte și după Edith
 2002 - Întoarcerea
 2002 - Oaza
 2003 - În coasta lui Adam
 2008 - Urme în Timp
 2009 - Supleantul

Bibliography in English

 1973 - Bough
 1974 - Blues
 1975 - Burial of the vine
 1975 - Boxes, Stairs & Whistle Time

 1978 - Before and After Edith

 2008 - Weregirls: Through the Moon Glass

Films

 1972 - Drum în penumbră - as producer
 1977 - The Last Wave (aka Black Rain in USA) - Ultimul val - as producer
 1982 - Friday the 13th Part III (1982) (uncredited) ... aka Friday the 13th Part 3 (USA: video title)
 1984 - Obsessive Love - (TV, story) - as writer
 1986 - Death of an Angel - Moartea unui înger - as director
 1988 - Emma: Queen of the South Seas TV mini-series - as writer
 1994 - Nobody's Children (TV)- as writer

References

Spiru Haret National College (Bucharest) alumni
Romanian emigrants to the United States
Romanian defectors
20th-century American novelists
21st-century American novelists
American male novelists
1944 births
American male screenwriters
American film directors
Living people
International Writing Program alumni
20th-century American male writers
21st-century American male writers